Major League Baseball (MLB) honors its best relief pitchers with a Reliever of the Month Award for one pitcher in the American League (AL) and one in the National League (NL) during each month of the regular season. These awards have been issued since 2017. From 2005 to 2013, MLB honored a single relief pitcher across both leagues with the Delivery Man of the Month Award during each month of the regular season.

Awards by month
MLB previously introduced a Reliever of the Year Award in 2014, awarded to one reliever in the American League and one in the National League. In 2017, MLB added a monthly award, also given to one reliever in each league, for each month of the regular season. The award was sponsored by The Hartford, a Connecticut-based investment and insurance company, from inception through the 2020 season.

The below table lists monthly winners; a number in parentheses indicates the instance of winning the award, for players who have previously won.

See also

Baseball awards
List of MLB awards

References

External links
List of winners at Baseball-Reference.com
List of winners at Baseball Almanac

Major League Baseball trophies and awards

Awards established in 2017